Lee Aaron (born Karen Lynn Greening; July 21, 1962) is a Canadian rock singer. She had several hits in the 1980s and early 1990s, such as "Metal Queen", "Whatcha Do to My Body", and "Sex with Love".

Early life
Aaron was born as Karen Lynn Greening in Belleville, Ontario, and began singing in school musicals at the age of five. She attended high school in Brampton, Ontario.

At age seventeen, Aaron was in a car accident. No surgery was required, but she did suffer a broken nose and badly bruised her face. However, years later Canadian Musician Magazine mistakenly embellished the incident into Aaron requiring complete facial reconstruction. The magazine printed a retraction in the following month's issue.

Career
After singing in a music production when she was fifteen years old, she was asked to join a local rock group called "Lee Aaron".  She sang, played alto saxophone and keyboards in this first incarnation of the band, and took on the stage name of Lee Aaron.

1980s
Aaron recorded her debut album, The Lee Aaron Project, in 1982 on Freedom Records; it was later reissued on Attic. The album featured well-known musicians of the Toronto music scene, including members of Moxy, Rif Raf3 (Q107 Homegrown Vol 4 / Lee Aaron Project band), Santers, and Triumph's Rik Emmett. Although the album was available in the UK only as an import, Aaron was invited to appear later that year at the Reading Festival.

In late 1982, Aaron flew to New York and posed topless for the men's magazine OUI. The magazine's March 1983 issue featured Aaron on the cover and in an interview. Aaron later concluded that posing for the magazine damaged her musical credibility; she regretted the decision and assigned blame for it to pressure from her manager.

1984's recording of the album Metal Queen resulted in a multi-album deal with Attic Records. During the recording of Metal Queen, guitarist John Albani (ex-Wrabit) joined the band and he and Aaron formed a solid songwriting partnership that lasted eleven years.

Between 1984 and 1992, Aaron toured extensively through Europe and made appearances in Japan and the United States. She released six albums on Attic Records in Canada and international releases in the United Kingdom, Germany, Austria, Switzerland, Benelux, Italy, Scandinavia, Australia and Japan. She won three Toronto Music Awards for Best Female Vocalist and ten Juno nominations. Her 1985 album Call Of The Wild featured her well-known rock ballad "Barely Holdin On".

Her most commercially successful album was Bodyrock, released in 1989. The album included several hit songs, including "Whatcha Do to My Body", and was certified double platinum in Canada.

1990s
In 1992, Aaron left Attic Records to start her label, Hip Chic Music, and released two more albums. On 1994's Emotional Rain (distributed by A & M Canada), Aaron recorded with Don Short and Don Binns (Sons of Freedom), Reeves Gabrels (David Bowie's Tin Machine), and Knox Chandler (the Psychedelic Furs).

1995's 2preciious was a project record written with members of Sons of Freedom, in which she dropped the name "Lee Aaron" entirely and used her real name, Karen. Neither of these recordings was commercially successful, and shortly afterwards, the Sons broke up.

Aaron studied acting for a year before beginning to perform jazz and blues in Toronto with Dennis Ziebart.

2000s

In 2000, Aaron released a jazz album, Slick Chick, on her imprint, Barking Dog Music, with distribution by Fusion 3. She performed extensively in support of this release, showcasing at The Top of the Senator in Toronto and various jazz festivals across Canada and Europe.

In 2002, Aaron was approached to audition with the Modern Baroque Opera Company. She was cast and appeared that year in an ALCAN Performing Arts Award-winning production called 101 Songs for the Marquis De Sade.

Her eleventh album, Beautiful Things, a pop-jazz hybrid, was released in 2004.

Aaron continued to play rock and selected jazz shows; in 2011 she made her first appearance in Sweden at the Sweden Rock Festival.

In March, 2016, Lee Aaron released her first all-rock album in 20 years. Self-financed and released on her own Big Sister Records, the new album was entitled Fire And Gasoline. Later that year she was inducted into the Brampton Arts Walk Of Fame. She then went on to appear at the Rockingham 2016 melodic/hard rock festival in Nottingham, United Kingdom.

In 2017, Lee Aaron played a number of shows in Germany as well as an appearance at Bang Your Head Festivals and two separate gigs in London and Wolverhampton.

Discography

Albums
{| class="wikitable"
|-
! Year !! Album !! RPM Top 100 !! SWE chart !! CH chart !! DE chart
|-
| 1982 || The Lee Aaron Project ||align="center"|- ||align="center"|- ||align="center"|- ||align="center"|- 
|-
| 1984 || Metal Queen ||align="center"|69 ||align="center"|- ||align="center"|- ||align="center"|- 
|-
| 1985 || Call of the Wild ||align="center"|86 ||align="center"|- ||align="center"|- ||align="center"|- 
|-
| 1987 || Lee Aaron ||align="center"|39 ||align="center"|26 ||align="center"|28 ||align="center"|51 
|-
| 1989 || Bodyrock ||align="center"|32 ||align="center"|- ||align="center"|- ||align="center"|36 
|-
| 1991 || Some Girls Do ||align="center"|38 ||align="center"|- ||align="center"|- ||align="center"|- 
|-
| 1994 || Emotional Rain ||align="center"|- ||align="center"|- ||align="center"|- ||align="center"|- 
|-
| 1996 || 2preciious (with 2preciious) ||align="center"|- ||align="center"|- ||align="center"|- ||align="center"|-  
|-
| 2000 || Slick Chick (with the Swingin' Barflies) ||align="center"|- ||align="center"|- ||align="center"|- ||align="center"|-  
|-
| 2004 || Beautiful Things ||align="center"|- ||align="center"|- ||align="center"|- ||align="center"|- 
|-
| 2016 || Fire and Gasoline ||align="center"|- ||align="center"|- ||align="center"|- ||align="center"|- 
|-
| 2018 || Diamond Baby Blues ||align="center"|- ||align="center"|- ||align="center"|- ||align="center"|- 
|-
| 2020 || Almost Christmas ||align="center"|- ||align="center"|- ||align="center"|- ||align="center"|- 
|-
| 2021 || Radio On! || align="center"|- ||align="center"|- ||align="center"|- ||align="center"|- 
|-
| 2022 || Elevate || align="center"|- ||align="center"|- ||align="center"|- ||align="center"|- 
|}

Compilations
1992: Powerline: The Best of Lee Aaron, Attic
2005: Museum: Videos, Clips and More 1997–20052008: Rarities, Studio & Live: 1981–20082012: Live in Sweden (DVD)
2012: Radio Hitz and More...''

Singles

References

External links

 
 

1962 births
Attic Records (Canada) artists
Canadian women heavy metal singers
Canadian women jazz singers
Canadian women rock singers
Canadian women guitarists
Canadian women songwriters
Living people
People from Belleville, Ontario
Singers from Ontario
20th-century Canadian women singers
21st-century Canadian women singers